Peter Sydney Godfrey Bridges, ARIBA (30 January 1925 – 24 January 2015) was an Anglican priest who served in three senior posts during the last third of the twentieth century.

Bridges was educated at Raynes Park County Grammar School and initially trained as an architect. He was ordained in 1958  and began his career as a Curate in Hemel Hempstead. After this he was  Resident Fellow at Birmingham University’s Institute for the Study of Worship and Religious Architecture from 1964 to 1967 and a Lecturer there from then until 1972 when he became the Archdeacon of Southend. In 1977 he became Archdeacon of Coventry; and in 1983 Archdeacon of Warwick, a post he held until his retirement. He died in January 2015, only a few days before his 90th birthday.

References

1925 births
2015 deaths
People educated at Raynes Park County Grammar School
Academics of the University of Birmingham
20th-century English Anglican priests
Archdeacons of Southend
Archdeacons of Coventry
Archdeacons of Warwick
Associates of the Royal Institute of British Architects